Bukkehåmåren is a mountain in Vågå Municipality in Innlandet county, Norway. The mountain is surrounded by several other notable mountains including Heimdalshøe to the east, Høgdebrotet and Tjønnholstinden to the southwest, Eggi to the west, Surtningssue to the northwest, and Besshø and Besseggen to the north, Veslfjellet to the northeast. The small lake Bukkehåmårtjønne lies just south of the mountain peak.

See also
List of mountains of Norway by height

References

Jotunheimen
Vågå
Mountains of Innlandet